QBasic is an integrated development environment (IDE) and interpreter for a variety of dialects of BASIC which are based on QuickBASIC. Code entered into the IDE is compiled to an intermediate representation (IR), and this IR is immediately executed on demand within the IDE.

Like QuickBASIC, but unlike earlier versions of Microsoft BASIC, QBasic is a structured programming language, supporting constructs such as subroutines. Line numbers, a concept often associated with BASIC, are supported for compatibility, but are not considered good form, having been replaced by descriptive line labels. QBasic has limited support for user-defined data types (structures), and several primitive types used to contain strings of text or numeric data. It supports various inbuilt functions.

For its time, QBasic provided a state-of-the-art IDE, including a debugger with features such as on-the-fly expression evaluation and code modification.

History 
QBasic was intended as a replacement for GW-BASIC. It was based on the earlier QuickBASIC 4.5 compiler but without QuickBASIC's compiler and linker elements. Version 1.0 was shipped together with MS-DOS 5.0 and higher, as well as Windows 95, Windows NT 3.x, and Windows NT 4.0. IBM recompiled QBasic and included it in PC DOS 5.x, as well as OS/2 2.0 onwards. eComStation and ArcaOS, descended from OS/2 code, include QBasic 1.0. QBasic 1.1 is included with MS-DOS 6.x, and, without EDIT, in Windows 95, Windows 98 and Windows Me. Starting with Windows 2000, Microsoft no longer includes QBasic with their operating systems, but still makes it available for use on newer versions of Windows.

Contents 
QBasic (as well as the built-in MS-DOS Editor) is backwards-compatible with DOS releases prior to 5.0 (down to at least DOS 3.20). However, if used on any 8088/8086 computers, or on some 80286 computers, the QBasic program may run very slowly, or perhaps not at all, due to DOS memory size limits. Until MS-DOS 7, MS-DOS Editor and Help required QBasic: the EDIT.COM and HELP.COM programs simply started QBasic in editor and help mode only, and these can also be entered by running QBASIC.EXE with the /EDITOR and /QHELP switches (i.e., command lines QBASIC /EDITOR and QBASIC /QHELP).

QBasic came complete with four pre-written example programs. These were Nibbles, a variant of the Snake game; Gorillas, an artillery game; MONEY MANAGER, a personal finance manager; and RemLine, a Q-BASIC code line-number-removing program.

QBasic has an Easter egg accessed by pressing and holding  simultaneously after running QBasic at the DOS prompt but before the title screen loads: this lists The Team of programmers.

See also 

 Microsoft Small Basic
 QB64

References

External links 

 Runnable QBasic 1.1 via the Internet Archives
 Download QBASIC 1.1 from the Internet Archive
 QB Express: Qbasic and Freebasic programming magazine
 : created in 1997, one of the oldest QBasic sites on the web
 Programmed Lessons in QBasic: an introduction

BASIC interpreters
Discontinued Microsoft BASICs
DOS software
Articles with example BASIC code
1991 software
BASIC programming language family
Microsoft programming languages
Programming languages created in 1991